Juliane Werding (born 19 July 1956 in Essen) is a German singer and alternative therapy practitioner (Heilpraktiker).

Her recordings include "Am Tag, als Conny Kramer starb" and "Nacht voll Schatten" in 1983 (German cover of Mike Oldfield's "Moonlight Shadow"). "Am Tag, als Conny Kramer starb" is the tune of the American song "The Night They Drove Old Dixie Down" by The Band with new lyrics about a different subject. Werding wrote several books and lives in Starnberg near Munich, where she works in alternative therapy. She has two children. In 2009, she quit show business to focus on working as a Heilpraktiker.

Discography 

 In tiefer Trauer (1972)
 Mein Name ist Juliane (1973)
 Wenn du denkst, du denkst, dann denkst du nur, du denkst (1975)
 ... ein Schritt weiter (1976)
 Oh Mann, oh Mann (1977)
 Traumland (1982)
 Ohne Angst (1984)
 Sehnsucht ist unheilbar (1986)
 Stimmen im Wind (1986)
 Jenseits der Nacht (1987)
 Tarot (1988)
 Zeit für Engel (1990)
 Zeit nach Avalon zu geh'n (1991)
 Sie weiß was sie will (1992)
 Du schaffst es! (1994)
 Alles okay? (1995)
 Land der langsamen Zeit (1997)
 Sie (1998)
 Es gibt kein zurück (2000)
 Die Welt danach (2004)
 Sehnsucher (2006)
 Ruhe vor dem Sturm (2008)

Publications
 Sagen Sie mal, Herr Jesus... (2001)
 Sehnsucher. 7 Wege, mit der Sehnsucht zu leben (2006)
 Huren, Heuchler, Heilige (2007)

Awards 

 Goldene Europa: 1972
 Goldene Stimmgabel: 1985, 1987, 1991, 1993, 1998

References

External links 

 

German women singers
Musicians from Essen
Living people
1956 births
Heilpraktiker